Matthias Martini Asperup (born 3 March 1995) is a Danish ice hockey player for the Herlev Eagles in the Metal Ligaen (DEN) and the Danish national team.

He represented Denmark at the 2021 IIHF World Championship.

His elder sister, Josephine, is also an ice hockey player and represented  at the 2021 IIHF Women's World Championship.

Career statistics

Regular season and playoffs

International

References

External links
 

1995 births
Living people
Copenhagen Hockey players
Danish expatriate ice hockey people
Danish expatriate sportspeople in Sweden
Danish ice hockey left wingers
Danish ice hockey right wingers
Gentofte Stars players
Herlev Eagles players
Rødovre Mighty Bulls players
People from Gladsaxe Municipality
Ice hockey players at the 2022 Winter Olympics
Olympic ice hockey players of Denmark
Sportspeople from the Capital Region of Denmark